Amphissa columbiana, known as the wrinkled dove snail, wrinkled amphissa, or Columbian amphissa, is a species of sea snail native to the western coast of North America, from California to Alaska.

References

Columbellidae
Gastropods described in 1916